Korošišta is a village in the municipality of Struga, North Macedonia.

Demographics
As of the 2021 census, Korošišta had 1,201 residents with the following ethnic composition:
Albanians 1,179
Persons for whom data are taken from administrative sources 20
Macedonians 1
Others 1

According to the 2002 census, the village had a total of 1,717 inhabitants. Ethnic groups in the village include:
Albanians 1,698
Macedonians 1
Serbs 1
Others 19

References

External links

Villages in Struga Municipality
Albanian communities in North Macedonia